The Chrysler Pacifica was a concept luxury minivan created by DaimlerChrysler under the Chrysler marque in 1999. The Pacifica was built in commemoration of the Chrysler minivan's 15th anniversary and was intended to be a more upscale variant of the Town & Country with an LHS inspired front fascia and a raised roof, which included a skylight and overhead storage bins. It could seat up to six, with four front and rear captain's chairs and fold-out jump seats on each of the rear seats. The 2nd row seats featured power footrests. The concept also had a golf bag rack in the trunk space that could hold up to four golf bags.

The name was eventually applied to a crossover, itself inspired by the Chrysler Citadel concept, which was produced from 2003 to 2008 and is currently being used on the replacement for the Town & Country minivan.

See also
Chrysler Citadel
Chrysler Pacifica crossover
Chrysler Pacifica minivan
Chrysler Town & Country

Pacifica (1999 concept vehicle)